Franklin Square Historic District  is a national historic district in Baltimore, Maryland, United States. It is a 19th-century rowhouse neighborhood developed along a strict grid street pattern. A one square block, two and a half acre public park, Franklin Square, is a focal point for the area and the most elaborate rowhousing surrounds the square. The district contains approximately 1,300 buildings of which approximately 1,250 contribute to the significance of the historic district.

It was added to the National Register of Historic Places in 1982.

References

External links
, including photo from 1981, at Maryland Historical Trust
Boundary Map of the Franklin Square Historic District, Baltimore City, at Maryland Historical Trust
Friends of West Baltimore Squares 

Historic districts on the National Register of Historic Places in Baltimore
Historic American Buildings Survey in Baltimore